There were two "Golden Bulls" issued in 1213,

 Golden Bull of 1213 in Germany
 Golden Bull of 1213 in England